Tonoyan – also transliterated as Tonojan or Tonoian – is an Armenian surname. Notable people with the surname include:
Aramayis Tonoyan (born 1969), retired Armenian footballer
David Tonoyan (born 1967), Armenian political figure and the current Defence Minister of Armenia
Iveta Tonoyan (born 1981), Armenian politician and journalist
Razmik Tonoyan (born 1988), Ukrainian sambist
Sargis Tonoyan (born 1988), Armenian Greco-Roman wrestler

Armenian-language surnames
Patronymic surnames